Heike Axmann (born 4 December 1968) is a German handball player. She was part of the team that won the 1993 World Championship. From 2004 to 2007 she coached the Buxtehuder SV.

References 

1968 births
Living people
People from Wismar
People from Bezirk Rostock
German female handball players
20th-century German women
Sportspeople from Mecklenburg-Western Pomerania